The program ShelXle is a graphical user interface for the structure refinement program SHELXL.

Overview 

ShelXle can display electron density maps like the macromolecular program Coot but is more intended for smaller molecules.
A number of excellent graphical user interfaces (GUIs) exist for small molecule crystal structure refinement with SHELX (e.g., WINGX, Olex2, XSEED, PLATON and SYSTEM-S, and the Bruker programs XP and XSHELL)

ShelXle is free software, distributed under the GNU LGPL. It is available from the ShelXle website or from SourceForge. Binaries are available for Windows, macOS  and the Linux distributions SuSE, Debian and Ubuntu.
The Windows binary is distributed with the NSIS Installer.

Features 

 Editor featuring syntax highlighting and code completion for the SHELX instructions.
 Clicking on an atom in the structure view sets the text cursor to the line that contains this atom.
 Locating atoms in structure view from the editor.
 Rename mode with support of residues and disordered parts and free variables.

Program architecture 

ShelXle uses the Qt (framework). It is written entirely in C++ and does not use any scripting language. For the refinement it calls the external binary of SHELXL which might also be SHELXH, SHELXLMP from George M. Sheldrick or XL from Bruker.

SHELX 

SHELX is developed by George M. Sheldrick since the late 1960s. Important releases are SHELX76 and SHELX97. It is still developed but releases are usually after ten years of testing.
Academic users can download the SHELX programs freely after registration.

External links
ShelXle web site
ShelXle support forum at xrayforum.co.uk
ShelXle at Sourceforge

References 

Crystallography software
Molecular modelling software
Free science software